Harold Roy McConnell (21 August 1927 – 24 July 2003) was an Australian rules footballer in the Victorian Football League (VFL).

Family
He married Patricia Mae Carter on 29 October 1951.

Football
He played for Essendon in the VFL.
[McConnell was] a strong, dashing defender. He was well known as  close playing spoiler with good spring and unexpected speed in his long legs. Surprisingly, he had a vision range of not much more than fifty yards, but this never affected his play. He had a remarkable ability for such a big man and was a top full back and centre half back during his career. He was a member of the 1949 and 1950 premiership teams and burst into League prominence by beating Carlton star, Jack Howell, in the 1949 grand final.

Controversial retirement
McConnell retired, controversially, at the end of the 1956 season.

Vice-Captain of the senior team, and its regular full-back, McConnell was selected as its 20th man in the last match of the season, against Geelong.
"He withdrew from the team [announcing his immediate retirement on the Friday] claiming that his form warranted a place in the eighteen. 'I have no grudge against Essendon, but I consider that I could have had a better go this season', he said."

The first emergency, John Towner, was appointed 20th man for the match.

Essendon Football Club
McConnell served on the Essendon Football Club's Committee (1957-1965), was its secretary (1973-1979), following the retirement of Bill Cookson, and was its first general manager (1980).

Footnotes

References
 Maplestone, M., Flying Higher: History of the Essendon Football Club 1872–1996, Essendon Football Club, (Melbourne), 1996.

External links
 
 
 Roy McConnell's profile at Essendon FC
 Boyles Football Photos: Roy McConnell.

Essendon Football Club players
Essendon Football Club Premiership players
Australian rules footballers from Victoria (Australia)
1927 births
2003 deaths
Two-time VFL/AFL Premiership players